Magdagachinsky District  is an administrative and municipal district (raion), one of the twenty in Amur Oblast, Russia. Its administrative center is the urban locality (a work settlement) of Magdagachi. Population:  26,427 (2002 Census);  The population of Magdagachi accounts for 48.1% of the district's total population.

Geography
Magdagachinsky District is located on the Amur-Zeya Plain, in the northwest of Amur Oblast.  It is on the eastern (left) bank of the Amur River.  The terrain is flat floodplain or slightly hilly ground between the Amur and the Zeya River, which runs in parallel along the district's eastern order about 10 km distant.  Both rivers in this area run north to south.  The Amur Highway runs through the middle of the district, as does the Trans-Siberian Railway.   Both highway and railway run through the administrative center of Magdagachi.  The district is 240 km north of the regional city of Blagoveshchensk.  The area measures 200 km (north-south), and 110 km (west-east); total area is 16667 km2 (about 5% of Amur Oblast).

The district is bordered on the north and east by Zeysky District, on the southeast by Shimanovsky District, on the west by Skovorodinsky District, and on the southwest by Daxing'anling Prefecture of Heilongjiang Province in China.

References

Notes

Sources

Districts of Amur Oblast